Stamps of the Soviet Union were issued in the period 1923 to 1991. They were labeled with the inscription  ("Post of the USSR"). In the thematics, Soviet stamps reflected to a large extent the history, politics, economics and culture of this world's first socialist state.

Notable designers of Soviet postage stamps were Ivan Dubasov (who designed the Lenin Mourning issue, the first stamps portraying Vladimir Lenin in 1924) and Vasily Zavyalov. By the mid-1970s, over 4,000 stamps came out in the USSR. In 1970, the Catalogue of Postage Stamps of the USSR, 1918–1969 was published in Moscow, the yearly supplements being produced afterwards. The history and design of Soviet postage stamps were elucidated in the annual publication Soviet Collector and the monthly magazine Filateliya SSSR.

First stamps 

The first postage stamps of the newly proclaimed Union of Soviet Socialist Republics were designed by Georgy Pashkov and issued in August 1923 in relation to the First All-Russian Agricultural and Handicraft Exhibition.

Definitive issues 

The first series of the USSR definitive stamps known as the Gold Standard issue appeared in October 1923. Their design proposed by Ivan Shadr included the busts of the worker, Red Army soldier and peasant. Also, there was a plan to sell more stamps in the international market. By targeting stamps for sales abroad, the Soviet government reckoned on earning hard currency.

Over the years, there was a steady increase in the number of different stamps issued annually by the USSR. Stamp denominations continued including international postage rates. For instance, most new issues during 1939 and 1940 had face values between 10 and 30 kopecks, i.e. more than those for standard internal postage.

One of the important topics represented on the USSR stamps was the Communist Party of the Soviet Union. It was usually done in two ways:
 dedicating stamps to numerous remarkable Party members, both the living and the deceased,
 placing the Party slogans and resolutions.

Vladimir Lenin was pictured on Soviet stamps most often among the Bolsheviks, with the first Leniniana stamps appeared after his death in January 1924. Lifetime images of Party members on stamps were used to emphasize the theme of state power. One of such examples was a 1935 set of stamps commemorating Mikhail Kalinin's 60th birthday and depicting him as a worker, a farmer, and an orator. These Kalinin stamps illustrated the motive powers of the Soviet state: the worker, the farmer, and the Communist Party. Such a practice is considered a worldwide trend when in-power politicians are shown on postage stamps symbolizing the state.

The Party slogans and resolutions on Soviet stamps changed over time. Earlier stamp themes in the 1920s reflected, though indirectly, the spirit of New Economic Policy. Since 1929, stamps had been used for a clear declaration of the changed economic policies. When Joseph Stalin initiated industrialisation, a special set of stamps was issued to support this effort. For example, the 10-kopecks stamp showed a series of tractors, saying "Let us increase the harvest by 35%". An inscription on the 20-kopecks stamp called for "More metal, more machines!". The 28-kopecks stamp pictured a blast furnace, a chart for iron-ore production and the slogan "Iron, 8 million tons".

After the Great Patriotic War, the government used stamps to call for economic reconstruction and mobilisation. A 1946 stamp issue summoned: "Give the country annually 127 million tons of grain", "60 million tons of oil", "60 million tons of steel", "500 million tons of coal", and "50 million tons of cast iron".

Short heroic slogans of the Stalin period calling for economic mobilization were substituted on Soviet stamps in the post-Stalin years. Party platforms with rather lengthy excerpts from Party documents and congresses' resolutions appeared on stamps at that time. Such was, for instance, the series of "Decisions of the 22nd Congress of the Communist Party of the Soviet Union—into Life" that was designed by Vasily Zavyalov and A. Shmidshtein, and issued in 1962.

In later years, the style of stamp messages continued, differing from those of the Stalin times. They were no longer brief imperative commands but rather promises and explanations by the Party to Soviet society. For example, on a 1971 souvenir sheet from the 24th Party Congress series designed by Yu. Levinovsky and A. Shmidshtein, there was an inscription saying that "the main problem is to provide a significant increase of the material and cultural level of life of the people on the basis of high rates of development of socialist production, an increase of its effectiveness, scientific-technical progress, and an acceleration of the growth of the productiveness of labor".

Such messages were typical of stamps for the Brezhnev and post-Brezhnev period until the changes occurred under Mikhail Gorbachev. New slogans, "perestroika", "uskoreniye", "demokratizatsiya", and "glasnost", were coined and appeared on the postage stamps of the USSR.

Rarities 

A unique complete pane of 25 early Soviet Union stamps is known as Soviet Air Post "Wide 5" surcharged. The stamp itself was produced in 1924 as a surcharge of 10 kopecks on 5-rouble green type II, basic stamp wide "5".

In 1925, a 15-kopeck yellow stamp of "Peasant" design was printed in a very small quantity within the Gold Standard issue. Named Limonka, it is considered very rare, especially if in mint condition.

Another very rare Soviet stamp, issued in 1931, is Aspidka, especially if imperforate; 24 imperforate specimens are known. Its design was created by Vasily Zavyalov.

In 1932, the All-Soviet Philatelic Exhibition was organized in Moscow. On that occasion, a souvenir sheet of four stamps known as Personalised Kartonka was produced on thick card, with three-line overprint "To the best shock worker of the All Russian Philatelic Society – President of the Moscow Philatelic Organization E.M. Nurk". It is considered rare because only 25 souvenir sheets were issued.

A San Francisco inverted surcharge with small Cyrillic "ф" ("f") is characteristic of a rare Soviet stamp called Levanevsky with overprint. Possibly unique, it was designed by Vasily Zavyalov and issued in 1935.

Due to a plate error (asymmetric star), a variety of the first Soviet numbered Tokyo Olympic souvenir sheet of 1964 is now quite rare and known as Green souvenir sheet.

The Russian Goznak stamp factory has released several sheets of the Tokyo 1964 trial stamps, they are very rare and there are few left.

Russia Seal of the USSR SC 2763a 1963 Spartakiad of nations. This year, the green commemorative block was printed in various shades. There was an error in color printing during production and the stamp was printed on a blue background, however there is a version where the blue background of the stamp was specially printed and put into circulation. Rare variation of this stamp.  

The blue variety appeared in the old catalogue stamps .

1979/1980 Olympic bear, mascot of the Olympics in Moscow. There are several sought-after test versions of this philatelic myth in circulation. Block 148 and SC # 4792 .

There are also test versions with an embossed goznak. Embossed mark on handmade paper and plastic - PVC . It is worth taking a closer look at the Goznak seal itself, enlarged.

Trial and demonstration versions of the Russian stamps were also printed on space-related topics. Gagarin stamp in 1976. Date of issue: 04/12/1976

in 1976, the USSR issued a stamp with Yuri Gagarin. Scot Sc# 4431 catalog.
The introduction of this stamp into circulation was preceded by trial series issued by the Russian printing house Goznak. At that time, the printing house used handmade paper with cotton threads as proofs and embossed the name of the stamp, but not always and not on all proof stamps. Currently, such stamps are very rare and eagerly sought after by philatelists.
 Denomination: 50 K.
 Perforations: 12 x 12
 Sheet Size: 1
 # Issued: 450,000
 Design: R. Strelnikov It also had a demonstration version with the Goznak sign embossed on interesting grain paper. Stamp version wanted. specimen / образец

Stamp thematics and other aspects 

Soviet Union stamps covered a great variety of themes. The thematics mirrored various aspects of Soviet history, politics, economics, and culture. These included:
 the accomplishments of the Great October Socialist Revolution,
 achievements of industry, agriculture, science, and culture,
 various anniversary celebrations.

After 1929, the quality of the Soviet stamps improved. Their agitational content expanded, as well. Increasing attention was given to stamps with face values of 7, 14, and 28 kopecks used for international correspondence. These stamps were "supposed to tell the truth to the world about the victories of the workers' country of the Soviets".

See also

Notes

References

External links 

 

 
Lists of postage stamps
1923 introductions